Suzanna Stanik (born 27 September 1954) is a former Judge of the Constitutional Court of Ukraine.

Education 
Stanik graduated from the Law Faculty of Lviv Ivan Franko State University with a Diploma cum laude in 1977. A decade later, she became a court participant at the Odesa Institute of Political Sciences and Sociology between 1988 and 1990.

Career 
In 1978, Stanik began to work, starting with a position in the executive bodies in Lviv and the Secretariat of the Cabinet of Ministers of Ukraine. In 1996, Stanik became a Minister of the Family and Youth Affairs of Ukraine. In 1997 she became the Minister of Justice. During this time, she also became a member of the Council of National Security and Defense. Between 1997 through 2004, she was the permanent representative of Ukraine to the UNICEF (United Nations Children's Fund). 

In October 1998, Stanik was awarded an honorary title "People's Ambassador of Ukraine." That decision was made by the Board of the Ukrainian Charity Foundation. Since then, she was the permanent Representative of Ukraine at the Council of Europe, and was then awarded rank of Ambassador extraordinary and Plenipotentiary by the President of Ukraine. 

In the early 2000s, she was appointed Judge of the Constitutional Court of Ukraine by the President and was elected Deputy Chairman of the Constitutional Court of Ukraine. In 2007, President Yushchenko of Ukraine attempted to remove three Constitutional Court Judges; one of them being Suzanna Stanik.

References 
Wikipedia Student Program

1954 births
Living people
Ukrainian judges
Constitutional Court of Ukraine judges